Jacques Bianco (27 June 1928 – 20 February 2011) was a French racing cyclist. He rode in the 1957 Tour de France.

References

1928 births
2011 deaths
French male cyclists
Place of birth missing